The 1981 Australian Endurance Championship was a CAMS sanctioned motor racing title for car manufacturers, contested with Group C Touring Cars. It was the 11th circuit racing manufacturers' championship title to be awarded by CAMS and the first to carry the Australian Endurance Championship name. No driver's title was awarded in connection with this championship.

Toyota were awarded the championship with a maximum possible score of 36 points, from Ford on 27, with Holden, Mazda and Mitsubishi tied for third on 24 points each.
Toyota's score was attained by Graeme Bailey, with three class wins, and Peter Williamson, with one. Both drove Toyota Celicas.

Calendar
The championship was contested over a four round series with each round staged as a single race of between 250 km and 500 km.

Classes
Cars competed in four classes based on engine capacity.
 Class A: 3001 to 6000cc
 Class B: 2001 to 3000cc
 Class C:1601 to 2000cc
 Class D: Up to 1600cc

Points system
Championship points were awarded on a 9-6-4-3-2-1 basis for the first six places in each class at each round, but only for the position attained by the best placed car of each make. No bonus points were awarded for outright placings.

Championship results

Note: Each manufacturer was ranked according to its best total class pointscore, e.g. Ford was awarded second place in the championship for the 27 points attained by Ford Capris in Class B, regardless of the points scored by Ford Falcons in Class A or Ford Escorts in Classes C & D. Only the best total class pointscore result for each manufacturer is shown in the above table.

Notes and references

External links
 1981 Adelaide AEC R1 Group C Touring Cars, www.youtube.com
 1981 Surfers Paradise International Resort 300 (AEC R4), www.youtube.com

Australian Endurance Championship
Endurance Championship
Australian Manufacturers' Championship